Vriesea triligulata is a plant species in the genus Vriesea. This species is endemic to Brazil.

Cultivars
 Vriesea 'Aztec Gold'
 Vriesea 'Purple Delight'

References

BSI Cultivar Registry Retrieved 11 October 2009

triligulata
Flora of Brazil